Ivo Bohumil Vesely (1 April 1926 – 4 December 2002) was an Australian ice hockey player. He competed in the men's tournament at the 1960 Winter Olympics.

References

1926 births
2002 deaths
Australian ice hockey players
Olympic ice hockey players of Australia
Ice hockey players at the 1960 Winter Olympics
Ice hockey people from Prague
Czechoslovak emigrants to Australia